Isosticta is a genus of damselflies in the family Isostictidae. There are about six described species in Isosticta.

Species
These six species belong to the genus Isosticta:
 Isosticta gracilior Lieftinck, 1975
 Isosticta handschini Lieftinck, 1933
 Isosticta humilior Lieftinck, 1975
 Isosticta robustior Ris, 1915
 Isosticta spinipes Selys, 1885
 Isosticta tillyardi Campion, 1921

References

Further reading

 
 
 

Isostictidae
Articles created by Qbugbot